Loxomorpha pulchellalis is a moth in the family Crambidae which was described by Harrison Gray Dyar Jr. in 1922. It is found in Argentina and South Africa.

References

Moths described in 1922
Spilomelinae
Lepidoptera of Argentina